Number 10 Squadron is a Royal Air Force squadron. The squadron has served in a variety of roles (observation, bombing, transport and aerial refuelling) over its 90-year history. It currently flies the Airbus Voyager KC2/KC3 in the transport/tanker role from RAF Brize Norton, Oxfordshire.

History

First World War

No. 10 Squadron of the Royal Flying Corps was formed from a nucleus provided by No. 1 Reserve Aircraft Squadron on 1 January 1915 at Farnborough Airfield, Hampshire. It initially acted as a training squadron until 27 July 1915 when it relocated to Saint-Omer on Western Front in France. No. 10 Squadron's first major engagement was providing spotting for the Indian Corps during the Battle of Loos in September 1915 with the Royal Aircraft Factory B.E.2. The squadron also participated in the Battle of the Somme in 1916. In April 1917, No. 10 Squadron carried out spotting and bombing duties during the Second Battle of Arras. The squadron re-equipped with the Armstrong Whitworth F.K.8 in September 1917.

In June 1918, No. 10 Squadron began to receive the Bristol F.2b. The squadron participated in the Second Battle of the Somme between August and September 1918. The squadron briefly spent time in Germany as part of the army of occupation after the armistice. On 8 February 1919, the squadron was reduced to a cadre and returned to the UK. It was disbanded on 31 December 1919 following the end of the First World War, like many other squadrons.

Interwar
On 3 January 1928, No. 10 Squadron was reformed as a night bomber unit at RAF Upper Heyford with the Handley Page Hyderabad. The unit relocated to RAF Boscombe Down in April 1931 and re-equipped with the Handley Page Hinaidi. These soon gave way to the Vickers Virginia in September 1932 before being replaced by the Handley Page Heyford in 1934. On 16 September 1935, the unit helped provide the nucleus to form No. 97 Squadron and later helped form No. 78 Squadron on 1 November 1936. No. 10 Squadron moved to RAF Dishforth on 25 January 1937 to form part of the newly created No. 4 Group of RAF Bomber Command (which they would remain a part of throughout the Second World War), converting to the monoplane Armstrong Whitworth Whitley Mk.I.

Second World War

On 8 September 1939, No. 10 Squadron began its first operation of the Second World War when it flew a leaflet dropping mission over Germany with the Whitley Mk.IV. On the night of 11/12 June 1940, Whitleys from No. 10 Squadron launched a raid on the Italian cities of Turin and Genoa. On 8 July 1940, the unit moved to RAF Leeming, Yorkshire. On 23 September 1940, the squadron launched a raid on the Boulogne docks in occupied-France.

In December 1941, the squadron converted to the Handley Page Halifax Mk.I/Mk.II. In July 1942, the squadron was split in two when a detachment was sent to RAF Aqir, British Mandate, which went on to form No. 462 Squadron of the Royal Australian Air Force. On 19 August 1942, No. 10 Squadron relocated to RAF Melbourne, Yorkshire, where it would remain until the end of the war in Europe.

On 7 May 1945, No. 10 Squadron was transferred to Transport Command and converted over to the Douglas Dakota. The squadron relocated to RAF Broadwell, Oxfordshire, on 6 August 1945.

Post-War

Transport Command (1945–1950)
Following the end of the war, No. 10 Squadron relocated to India in October 1945 where it carried out transport duties until it disbanded on 20 December 1947. The squadron was reformed once more on 4 October 1948 when No. 238 Squadron was renumbered to No. 10 Squadron at RAF Oakington, Cambridgeshire. Between 1948 and 1949, the squadron took part in the Berlin Airlift, operating from RAF Lübeck. No. 10 Squadron disbanded once more on 20 February 1950.

Bomber Command (1953–1964)
On 15 January 1953, No. 10 Squadron reverted to its original bomber role upon its reformation at RAF Scampton, Lincolnshire, with the English Electric Canberra B.2. In April 1955, the squadron moved to RAF Honington, Suffolk, while Scampton was closed for runway works. Between October and November 1956, No. 10 Squadron deployed to RAF Nicosia, Cyprus, during the Suez Crisis. From RAF Nicosia, Canberra B.2 WH853 of No. 10 Squadron dropped the first RAF bombs on Egypt during a raid on Almaza Air Base on 31 October 1956. The squadron disbanded on 15 January 1957.

No. 10 Squadron reformed at RAF Cottesmore on 15 April 1958 flying the Handley Page Victor B.1 until disbandment on 1 March 1964.

Vickers VC10 (1966–2005)

The squadron's numberplate was transferred back from Bomber Command to Transport Command in 1965, and on 1 July 1966 the squadron reformed at RAF Brize Norton as the first operators to receive the new Vickers VC10 C.1.

Fourteen VC10 C.1s were delivered to 10 Squadron between 1966 and 1967. The C.1 was a variant of the civil 'Standard VC10' fitted with the wing and more powerful engines of the 'Super VC10'. The C.1 could carry 139 passengers in rear-facing seats, eight standard pallets or up to 78 medical evacuation stretchers. These VC10s were named after airmen who had been awarded the Victoria Cross.

The most visible role No. 10 Squadron's VC10s played was that of VIP transport and aeromedical evacuations. In the VIP role the C1s flew the British Royal Family, government ministers and Prime Ministers around the world. Later the VC10 VIP role was phased out, VIP transport being carried out by chartered British Airways 767s and the RAF BAe 146 fleet. However, former Prime Minister Tony Blair reverted to the VC10 for more sensitive flights, notably during his diplomacy to Pakistan and the Middle East after the 11 September 2001 attacks. The rationalisation of the VC10 force led to No. 10 Squadron being disbanded on 14 October 2005, with their C.1(K) aircraft transferred to No. 101 Squadron.

Airbus Voyager (2011–present)

In 2011, with the closure of RAF Lyneham and the transfer of the RAF's Hercules force to Brize Norton, it was announced that No. 10 Squadron would be reformed as the first operator of the new Airbus Voyager. The squadron was officially reformed on 1 July 2011. The first Voyager (ZZ330) was delivered to Brize Norton on 5 April 2012. Operations began with the Voyager on 12 May 2012, with a sortie flown from RAF Brize Norton to RAF Akrotiri, Cyprus. The first air-to-air refuelling flight with the Voyager took place on 20 May 2013, when No. 10 Squadron refuelled Panavia Tornado GR4s. No. 10 Squadron has helped support Operation Shader since September 2014.

Aircraft operated 
Aircraft operated include:

Farman MF.7 (Jan 1915 – Apr 1915)
Farman MF.6 (Jan 1915 – Apr 1915)
Blériot XI (Jan 1915 – Apr 1915)
Martinsyde S.1 (Jan 1915 – Apr 1915)
Royal Aircraft Factory B.E.2c (Jan 1915 – Apr 1917)
Royal Aircraft Factory B.E.12 (June 1916 – July 1916)
Royal Aircraft Factory B.E.2d (July 1916 – Feb 1917)
Royal Aircraft Factory B.E.2e (Dec 1916 – July 1917)
Royal Aircraft Factory B.E.2f (Jan 1917 – July 1917)
Royal Aircraft Factory B.E.2g (Jan 1917 – July 1917)
Armstrong Whitworth F.K.8 (July 1917 – Feb 1919)
Bristol F.2b (June 1918 – Oct 1918)
Handley Page Hyderabad (Jan 1928 – Nov 1931)
Handley Page Hinaidi (Dec 1930 – Sep 1932)
Vickers Virginia Mk.X (Sep 1932 – Jan 1935)
Handley Page Heyford Mk.Ia (Aug 1934 – Jan 1936)
Handley Page Heyford Mk.III (Nov 1935 – Jun 1937)
Armstrong Whitworth Whitley Mk.I (Mar 1937 – June 1939)
Armstrong Whitworth Whitley Mk.IV (May 1939 – May 1940)
Armstrong Whitworth Whitley Mk.V (May 1940 – Dec 1941)
Handley Page Halifax Mk.I (Dec 1941 – Aug 1942)
Handley Page Halifax Mk.II (Dec 1941 – Mar 1944)
Handley Page Halifax Mk.III (Mar 1944 – May 1945)
Douglas Dakota Mk.III (May 1945 – Dec 1947)
Douglas Dakota Mk.IV/C.4 (May 1945–Dec 1947; Oct 1948 – Feb 1950)
English Electric Canberra B.2 (Jan 1953 – Dec 1956)
Handley Page Victor B.1 (Apr 1958 – Mar 1964)
Vickers VC10 C.1 (July 1966 – Nov 1995)
Vickers VC10 C.1K (Dec 1992 – Oct 2005)
Airbus Voyager KC.2 (Apr 2012 – present)
Airbus Voyager KC.3 (Sep 2013 – present)

See also
 List of Royal Air Force aircraft squadrons

References

Notes

Bibliography

 Ashworth, Chris. Encyclopedia of Modern Royal Air Force Squadrons. Wellingborough, UK: Patrick Stevens Limited, 1989. .
 Bennett, Donald C.T. Pathfinder (Bomber Crews). Goodall Publications, 1958 (reprinted 1988 and 1998 and by Crécy Publishing in 1999). .
 Falconer, Jonathan. RAF Airfield of World War 2. Ian Allan Publishing, 1995 .
 Halley, James J. The Squadrons of the Royal Air Force & Commonwealth, 1918–1988. Tonbridge, Kent, UK: Air-Britain (Historians) Ltd., 1988. .
 Jefford, C.G. RAF Squadrons, a Comprehensive Record of the Movement and Equipment of all RAF Squadrons and their Antecedents since 1912. Shrewsbury: Airlife Publishing, 2001. .
 Macmillan, Ian; King, Richard From Brooklands to Brize - A Centennial History of No 10 Squadron 1915 - 2015 10 Squadron Association, 2015
 Moyes, Philip J.R. Bomber Squadrons of the RAF and their Aircraft. London: Macdonald and Jane's (Publishers) Ltd., 1964 (new edition 1976). .
 Philpott, Ian The Birth of the Royal Air Force. Pen and Sword, 2013. 
 Rawlings, John D.R. Coastal, Support and Special Squadrons of the RAF and their Aircraft. London: Jane's Publishing Company Ltd., 1982. .
 Sawyer, Group Captain Tom, DFC. Only Owls & Bloody Fools Fly at Night. London: Kimber, 1982 (republished by Crécy Publishing in 1985). .
 Shirt, J. Gordon. Gordon's Tour with Shiny 10: Wartime Record of a Tour with RAF No.10 Squadron. Compaid Graphics, 1994. .
 Silver, L. Ray. Last of the Gladiators: A World War II Bomber Navigator's Story. Shrewsbury, Shropshire, UK: Airlife Publishing Ltd., 1995. .
 Smith, Arthur C. Halifax Crew: the Story of a Wartime Bomber Crew. Carlton Publications, 1983. (2nd edition, Yorkshire Air Museum Publications, 1987).
 Travers, E. Cross Country. Sittingbourne, Kent, UK: Hothersall & Travers, 1989. (from log books & letters of 3 10 Squadron pilots: James Lindsay Travers, Herbert Gardner Travers & Charles Tindal Travers)
 Ward, Chris. 10 Squadron (Bomber Command Profile no. 3). Berkshire, UK: Ward Publishing, 1996.

External links

 No.10 Squadron RAF
 Official history of No. 10 Squadron
 World War II bases of No. 10 Squadron
 History for Nos. 6–10 Squadron on Rafweb
 Aircraft and markings of No. 10 Squadron on Rafweb

Military units and formations established in 1915
010 Squadron
010 Squadron
1915 establishments in the United Kingdom
Military units and formations in Mandatory Palestine in World War II